Rudolf Keller (born 6 October 1925) is a Swiss former ice hockey player who competed for the Swiss national team at the 1956 Winter Olympics in Cortina d'Ampezzo. He also competed in the men's tournament at the 1952 Summer Olympics.

References

External links
 
Ruedi Keller statistics at Sports-Reference.com

1925 births
Possibly living people
Ice hockey players at the 1956 Winter Olympics
Olympic ice hockey players of Switzerland
Swiss ice hockey defencemen
Swiss male field hockey players
Olympic field hockey players of Switzerland
Field hockey players at the 1952 Summer Olympics